Steven Universe Future is an American animated limited series created by Rebecca Sugar for Cartoon Network. It serves as an epilogue to the 2013–2019 original series Steven Universe and its follow-up 2019 animated film Steven Universe: The Movie. It premiered on December 7, 2019 and concluded on March 27, 2020.

The series focuses on the aftermath of the events of Steven Universe, where humans and Gems coexist in harmony after the end of the war between the Crystal Gems and Gem Homeworld. Without the threats of the Diamonds or corrupted Gems, Steven must deal with the everyday challenges that still come with his now relatively peaceful life, and question his new life objectives.

Like the original series, Steven Universe Future has been critically acclaimed, with the design, music, voice acting, characterization, and prominence of LGBT themes being similarly praised; Future has been singled out for addressing issues some had with the original series, for its unique choice of focusing on the aftermath of the main story's climax, and for promoting mental health awareness through its treatment of Steven's experience with psychological trauma. The show was nominated for the 2020 Primetime Emmy Award for Short Form Animated Program.

Premise and synopsis
The series is set after the events of Steven Universe: The Movie, which itself takes place two years after the Steven Universe series finale "Change Your Mind". In "Change Your Mind", teenage protagonist Steven persuaded the Diamonds, the rulers of the intergalactic Gem empire, to cease their abusive, imperialist ways, and to heal the monstrous corrupted Gems that had been menacing the planet Earth. Now, Steven and his friends and family, the Crystal Gems, have constructed Little Homeworld, a community on Earth where humans and Gems can live in harmony. Steven now dedicates his time to inviting Gems to come to "Little Homeschool," and educating those who do not know how to find their new place in the galaxy.

Steven Universe Future follows Steven's everyday life trying to help Gems find new purpose; it also depicts the disappointments he faces with his new life, including the realization that there are things he cannot fix, and his own feelings of aimlessness after successfully liberating the Gem empire. He confronts old foes who are looking for revenge, tries to master a new power that he doesn't fully understand, and is challenged to decide what he wants for his own future.

Cast and characters

Main 
 Zach Callison as Steven Universe/Monster Steven, Onion, Cactus Steven, and Jingle Singer
 Estelle Swaray as Garnet
 Michaela Dietz as Amethyst, and other Quartz Gems
 Deedee Magno Hall as Pearl, Pink Pearl/Volleyball, Shell, Brandish, Mega Pearl and Aubergine Pearl
 Shelby Rabara as Peridot

Recurring
 Tom Scharpling as Greg Universe
 Grace Rolek as Connie Maheswaran
 Charlyne Yi as Ruby, Eyeball, and other Rubies
 Erica Luttrell as Sapphire
 Jennifer Paz as Lapis Lazuli and other Lapises
 Miriam A. Hyman as Bismuth ("Everything's Fine", "I Am My Monster" & "The Future")
 Kimberly Brooks as Jasper and other Quartz gems
 Sarah Stiles as Spinel
 Christine Ebersole as White Diamond
 Patti LuPone as Yellow Diamond
 Lisa Hannigan as Blue Diamond
 Michelle Maryk as Larimar
 Dee Bradley Baker as Lion

Guest
 Uzo Aduba as Bismuth (“Bismuth Casual”) and Khadijah
 Matthew Moy as Lars Barriga
 Kate Micucci as Sadie Miller
 Reagan Gomez-Preston as Jenny Pizza
 Brian Posehn as Sour Cream
 Mary Elizabeth McGlynn as Priyanka Maheswaran
 Lamar Abrams as Wy-Six, Jaime, and Daniel
 Indya Moore as Shep
 Johnny Hawkes as Rodrigo and Cookie Cat
 Marieve Herington as Jasmine
 Tahani Anderson as Patricia
 Ian Jones-Quartey as Snowflake Obsidian
 Natasha Lyonne as Smoky Quartz
 Alastair James as Rainbow Quartz 2.0
 Shoniqua Shandai as Sunstone
 Christine Pedi as Holly Blue Agate
 Della Saba as Aquamarine
 Larissa Gallagher as Bluebird Azurite
 Chris Jai Alex as Drew the Dog and Announcer
 Jemaine Clement as Kerry Moonbeam
 Susan Egan as Rose Quartz/Pink Diamond (archive audio)

Episodes 

The series consisted of a total of 20 11-minute episodes, with a four-part finale that aired on March 27, 2020.

All episodes were supervised directed by Kat Morris and Alonso Ramirez Ramos, with Liz Artinian directing all of the art. The art was also co-directed by Patrick Bryson for the first four episodes.

Production 
According to Rebecca Sugar, when she was notified in 2016 that Steven Universe would be canceled after the end of the fifth season, she prevailed upon Cartoon Network to allow her to produce the followup film, Steven Universe: The Movie. When Cartoon Network approved the movie, they also green-lighted an additional season of episodes that the movie could serve to promote; 6 of the 26 additional episodes were used to extend the original series’ fifth season in order to wrap up the story, and the remaining 20 became Steven Universe Future.

Writing
In April 2022, Kate Tsang, a series writer, and for Adventure Time: Distant Lands, said that for the series she could write what she "wanted to see". She also stated that the series had a "heart to it" and optimism which she incorporated into her 2022 film, Marvelous and the Black Hole. It was also said that the series helping Tsang with how she approached her rewrites.

Music 
The opening theme, "Steven Universe Future", is a new version of the song "Happily Ever After" from Steven Universe: The Movie, replacing "We Are the Crystal Gems" from the original series. The show's main voice actors, Zach Callison (Steven), Estelle (Garnet), Michaela Dietz (Amethyst) and Deedee Magno Hall (Pearl), who had performed both the opening of the original series and "Happily Ever After" in The Movie, perform Steven Universe Future alongside additional cast members Jennifer Paz (Lapis), Shelby Rabara (Peridot), Uzo Aduba (Bismuth) and  Grace Rolek  (Connie)

LGBTQ representation

Like its precursor, the series has many examples of queer and non-binary representation. 

Sadie's romantic interest, Shep, is a non-binary person of color, voiced by nonbinary actor Indya Moore. Unlike Stevonnie, Shep is the show's first non-binary character who is fully human. Reviewers argue that this could mean Sadie is not heterosexual. Den of Geek states, "Straight people can obviously date non-binary people but...Sadie is more than likely queer and that’s incredible." 

During the episode Bismuth Casual,  Stevonnie, the intersex and non-binary fusion of Steven and Connie, appears.

In "Volleyball," Pink Pearl (nicknamed "Volleyball") reminisces romantically over Pink Diamond, to which Pearl sneers, "Looks like someone's still got it bad," insinuating that - like Pearl once did - Pink Pearl still harbors romantic feelings towards the late Pink Diamond. However, it is later revealed that Pink Diamond physically abused Pink Pearl, causing irreparable psychological trauma that is reflected in Pink Pearl's physical form as a head injury. 

In "Bismuth Casual," Bismuth indirectly confesses she has a crush on Pearl. Both characters are female-coded and use feminine pronouns, like all gems, though some sources argue that all gems are non-binary, as they are "genderless sentient aliens."

In 2020, Maya Peterson, a storyboarder for the show, stated that Peridot was asexual and aromantic, despite Peterson's reservations that she is only a secondary creator of the show. Before (and after this point), fans had shipped Peridot with various other characters, specifically Lapis Lazuli and Amethyst, some reviewers even seeing Peridot and Lapis in a "close, loving relationship" in 2018 when the two characters lived together in a barn. The announcement of Peridot's asexuality/aromanticism pleased many fans. Peterson also stated that the show's writers did not discuss whether or not Peridot was autistic, although it was a possibility, and many fans perceived Peridot to be on the spectrum.

Release

Announcement 
Prior to the announcement of Future, Sugar and the crew of Steven Universe stayed silent regarding a potential sixth season of Steven Universe, leaving fans with uncertainty over the future of the series, with some believing The Movie to be the conclusion of Steven's story; at New York Comic Con in October 2019, Sugar confirmed that there would be no sixth season of Steven Universe (therefore retroactively confirming the season 5 finale "Change Your Mind" as the series finale), but announced Future, and shared the opening of the epilogue limited series with the audience. Several media outlets misinterpreted the announcement as a confirmation of a sixth season, with Future as a simple sub-title.

The official premise of the show was: "After saving the universe, Steven is still at it, tying up every loose end. But as he runs out of other people's problems to solve, he'll finally have to face his own."

Broadcast 
Steven Universe Future premiered on December 7, 2019 on Cartoon Network. It premiered on Cartoon Network UK on December 23, 2019.

Home media
On December 8, 2020, all 20 episodes of the series were released on the Steven Universe: The Complete Collection DVD, alongside the entirety of the original series and the movie.

Reception 
Steven Universe Future has been acclaimed by critics. Like the original series and Steven Universe: The Movie, the characterization, themes, animation, voice acting, music, and LGBT representation have been widely praised; Future in particular is praised for its new ways of exploring previously developed themes (in particular Steven's dedication to solve other characters' problems), and its unconventional choice of focusing on the smaller-scale aftermath of the main storyline. Reviewers have pointed out that it addresses issues several fans and reviewers had with the original series, such as its perceived tendency to solve characters' problems in overly simple ways and to redeem all antagonists.

Caroline Cao of /Film called Steven Universe Future "a messy and beautiful tale of trauma, healing, and survival", stating: "Sugar and her team are the greatest visual maximalists in animation, pushing imageries to their most emotional and thematic extremes—particularly through the inventiveness of the flexible Fusion metaphor—and unraveling difficult revelations about surviving trauma." She praised the exploration of Steven's tendency to help other people with their problems, claiming that "Steven faces the reoccurring lesson of 'biting more than you can chew.' Steven wants to heal everyone, anything, but falls short, and even unleashes destruction at times. As Future moves forward, Steven will contend with his own management of the new world order he has created, and his mother’s past will continue to haunt his future. Then there's the matter of Steven's newest Gem power that manifests through his rage and insecurities. Steven Universe Future is on a roll in delivering hard and relevant messages about victimhood and survivorhood solidarity. There are kids and adults alike who need someone to tell them 'I'm sorry for not believing you'."

The Mary Sue labeled Steven Universe Future "fantastic", praising "the amazing storytelling" and the "beautiful" animation. Reuben Baron of CBR praised the series for "challenging Steven's savior mentality", stating that the first four episodes were "developing a clear thematic throughline. Picking up the loose ends from the original series, it's working to address criticisms of Steven as a character without betraying the show's essential ethos." In his review of the episode "Bluebird", Shamus Kelley of Den of Geek stated that Future "finally addressed something of a complaint many had towards the series. As much as Steven Universe is all about love being the answer and Steven trying to be friends with everyone, there's still a nagging sense that it's all a bit... simple. Obviously what Steven and the Crystal Gems is incredibly taxing [sic] but the end result just being everyone is mostly friends? That’s fairly unrealistic [...] So the fact that Aquamarine and Eyeball Ruby just flat out hate him? It’s an acknowledgement, one that show takes it time to make explicit, that not everyone wants to change. Not everyone is down for learning to love and be friends".

Charles Pulliam-Moore of Gizmodo heavily praised Steven Universe Future for further establishing Pink Diamond/Rose Quartz as "the villain of the decade", stating "When Steven Universe Future reveals exactly how Volleyball, the Pink Pearl, got her cracked face, the series is cluing viewers into the specific reasons why the other Diamonds were reluctant to give Pink what she wanted. It wasn't just that she was inexperienced, but rather she was inexperienced, dangerous, and all too capable of letting her powers run wild in ways that would actively harm others. [...] You see just how Not Over™ Pink basically all of the Gems still are. Pink's legacy is one of the lasting, seemingly unending sadness that the other Gems are attempting to work through. The majority of them don't feel much ill will toward her, but she's still hurting them in ways that only the dead and dearly missed can. There are Gems like Spinel who have all the reasons in the galaxy to hate Pink, but that's not really where any of the people in the series are coming from. Rather, everyone's in different stages of mourning and not a single one of them can really be sure if and when the pain they're dealing with is going to go away."

The introduction of Shep, a non-binary character who appears in the episode "Little Graduation" and is played by non-binary actor Indya Moore, received attention from various outlets. The Mary Sue stated that with Future, Steven Universe "continues to be one of the most wonderfully diverse shows on television. We got to see in 'Little Graduation' a new human character named Shep—who is non-binary and voiced by a non-binary voice actor, Pose'''s Indya Moore—canonically queer couples, and one of them being a brown-skinned person!". /Film stated about the episode "Little Graduation": "what a fine way to wrap up 2019 by pushing the bar for queer representation through the introduction of the loveably chill Shep [...] They pop as the sort of character who has earned a Fan Favorite Title. Despite knowing the titular character for an hour, Shep participates in the proceedings by cooling down Steven."

100% of 7 critic reviews compiled by review aggregator website Rotten Tomatoes are positive, and the average rating is 10/10.

Awards and nominations

Future
While Rebecca Sugar has confirmed that this is the series finale of the franchise and that there is no continuation in development, nor any ongoing projects, she has hinted that possible future stories exist. "The story is continuing off screen and I do know what happens next...But I would have to decide how and when I'd want to dig into that, or if it's best to give them their privacy."

Sugar later told Fast Company: "I'm certainly interested in spending more time in this world with these characters. But the thing about Steven Universe, it's about Steven Universe and I want to give him the time to heal", [Sugar says.] "I want to give that to my team as well. So I'm not really sure for certain what's going to happen in the future. I have a few ideas, but I'm going to take a little time to reevaluate everything before I jump into them." When asked by TVLine, Sugar responded similarly, "I love these characters and this world, and I have theories about the timelines that follow Future''. But I want to give the characters some time and some privacy, at least for a while. I need a little of that too."

Notes

References

External links 

2010s American animated television series
2010s American comedy-drama television series
2010s American comic science fiction television series
2010s American LGBT-related animated television series
2010s American LGBT-related comedy television series
2010s American LGBT-related drama television series
2019 American television series debuts
2020 American television series endings
2020s American animated television series
2020s American comedy-drama television series
2020s American LGBT-related animated television series
2020s American LGBT-related comedy television series
2020s American LGBT-related drama television series
2020s American science fiction television series
American children's animated action television series
American children's animated comic science fiction television series
American children's animated drama television series
American children's animated musical television series
American children's animated science fantasy television series
American children's animated space adventure television series
American sequel television series
Anime-influenced Western animated television series
Television series by Cartoon Network Studios
Coming-of-age television shows
English-language television shows
Lesbian-related television shows
Post-traumatic stress disorder in fiction
 
Teen animated television series
Television series about alien visitations
Television series about ancient astronauts
Television shows set in Delaware
LGBT speculative fiction television series